Diuris porrifolia, commonly called the small-flowered donkey orchid is a species of orchid which is endemic to the south-west of Western Australia. It has two or three leaves and up to seven yellow flowers with brown or reddish markings. It is similar to the common donkey orchid (D. corymbosa) but its flowers are smaller and it has a more easterly distribution.

Description
Flowering occurs from late July to September.

This species is similar to D. corymbosa but has smaller flowers and a more easterly distribution. It has also been confused with the recently described (2016) western wheatbelt donkey orchid (D. brachyscapa) which has larger flowers and a more westerly distribution.

Taxonomy and naming
Diuris porrifolia was first formally described in 1840 by John Lindley and the description was published in A Sketch of the Vegetation of the Swan River Colony as an appendix to Edwards's Botanical Register. The specific epithet (porrifolia) is derived from the Latin words porrum meaning "a leek" and folia meaning "leaves", referring to the shape of the leaves of this species.

The Index Kewensis  lists this name as a synonym of Diuris corymbosa.

Distribution and habitat
The small-flowered donkey orchid occurs between Perth and Boyup Brook where it grows in woodland and forest.

Conservation
Diuris porrifolia is classified as "not threatened" by the Western Australian Government Department of Parks and Wildlife.

References

porrifolia
Endemic orchids of Australia
Orchids of Western Australia
Endemic flora of Western Australia
Plants described in 1840